The Ottawa Outlaws were a professional ultimate franchise based in Ottawa, Ontario, Canada. They were members of the Eastern Conference of the American Ultimate Disc League (AUDL).

The Outlaws were founded in 2014 and played from 2015 to 2022.

References

Sports teams in Ottawa
Ultimate (sport) teams
Ultimate teams established in 2014
2014 establishments in Ontario